Cristina López Barrio (Madrid, 12 May 1970) is a Spanish writer and lawyer.

Life
She studied law at the Complutense University of Madrid and she did a specialisation in IP at the Comillas Pontifical University. She followed a creative writing workshop with Clara Obligado in 2000.

Works
Niebla en Tánger, 2017
Tierra de brumas, 2015
El cielo en un infierno cabe, 2013
El reloj del mundo, 2012
La casa de los amores imposibles, 2010
El hombre que se mareaba con la rotación de la Tierra, 2009

Prizes
Premio Villa Pozuelo de Alarcón, 2009
Premi Blog Llegir en cas d'incendi, 2010
Finalista Premio Planeta, 2017

References

External links
  cristinalopezbarrio.com 

1970 births
Living people
Spanish women lawyers
20th-century Spanish lawyers
Complutense University of Madrid alumni
Writers from Madrid
20th-century women lawyers
20th-century Spanish women